6082 aluminium alloy is an alloy in the wrought aluminium-magnesium-silicon family (6000 or 6xxx series). It is one of the more popular alloys in its series (alongside alloys 6005, 6061, and 6063), although it is not strongly featured in ASTM (North American) standards. It is typically formed by extrusion and rolling, but as a wrought alloy it is not used in casting. It can also be forged and clad, but that is not common practice with this alloy. It cannot be work hardened, but is commonly heat treated to produce tempers with a higher strength but lower ductility.

Alternate names and designations include AlSi1MgMn, 3.2315, H30, and A96082. The alloy and its various tempers are covered by the following standards:

 EN 485-2: Aluminium and aluminium alloys. Sheet, strip and plate. Mechanical properties
 EN 573-3: Aluminium and aluminium alloys. Chemical composition and form of wrought products. Chemical composition and form of products
 EN 754-2: Aluminium and aluminium alloys. Cold drawn rod/bar and tube. Mechanical properties
 EN 755-2: Aluminium and aluminium alloys. Extruded rod/bar, tube and profiles. Mechanical properties
 ISO 6361: Wrought Aluminium and Aluminium Alloy Sheets, Strips and Plates

Chemical composition

The alloy composition of 6082 aluminium is:

Properties

Typical material properties for 6082 aluminum alloy include:

References

Aluminum alloy table 

Aluminium alloys
Aluminium–magnesium–silicon alloys